Survive Style 5+ is a 2004 Japanese film directed by Gen Sekiguchi and produced by Hiroyuki Taniguchi. It stars Tadanobu Asano, Kyōko Koizumi, Reika Hashimoto, Jai West, Sonny Chiba and Vinnie Jones.

Synopsis
The film follows five simultaneous, loosely linked plot lines, that intertwine and scramble together. A man (Tadanobu Asano) keeps killing his wife (Reika Hashimoto) and burying her in the woods only to find her alive, furious, and waiting for him when he returns home. A suburban family's life is disrupted when the father (Ittoku Kishibe) is permanently hypnotized into believing he is a bird and tries to learn how to fly. A trio of aimless youth pass time by burgling houses. A murderous advertising executive (Kyōko Koizumi) tries to imagine ideas for commercials. The stories clash together through the intervention of a thuggish hitman (Vinnie Jones) and his translator (Yoshiyoshi Arakawa).

Cast
 Tadanobu Asano as Masahiro Ishigaki
 Reika Hashimoto as Mimi, Ishigaki's wife
 Pierre Taki as a motorcycle policeman
 Kyōko Koizumi as Yoko, the commercial businesswoman
 Asumi Miwa as a waitress
 Hiroshi Abe as Aoyama, the hypnotist
 Ittoku Kishibe as Tatsuya Kobayashi, the husband
 Yumi Asō as Misa Kobayashi, the wife
 Shihori Kanjiya as Kaho Kobayashi, the daughter
 Ryūnosuke Kamiki as Keiichi Kobayashi, the son
 Kanji Tsuda as a Tsuda, a burglar
 Yoshiyuki Morishita as Morishita, a burglar
 Jai West as J, a burglar
 Vinnie Jones as Jimmy Funky Knife, an assassin
 Yoshiyoshi Arakawa as Katagiri, the assassin's interpreter
 Tae Kimura as a flight attendant
 Sonny Chiba as Kazama, a pharmaceutical company president
 Tomokazu Miura as Yamauchi, a doctor

Release
Survive Style 5+ was shown at the Locarno Film Festival on August 6, 2004.

Soundtrack
The film's original soundtrack is by James Shimoji, and additionally features songs by Takkyu Ishino and Yasuyuki Okamura, Rob Laufer, Jim Gilstrap, Jess Harnell, and Cake.

References

External links
 
 
 

2004 films
Japanese LGBT-related films
Gay-related films
2000s Japanese films